Faust is an extinct town in Pemiscot County, in the U.S. state of Missouri. It was in eastern Concord Township.  The exact location of the town site is unknown to the GNIS.

A post office called Faust was established in 1911, and remained in operation until 1920.

References

Ghost towns in Missouri
Former populated places in Pemiscot County, Missouri